is a Japanese swimmer. He competed in the men's 50 metre butterfly at the 2019 World Aquatics Championships.

References

External links
 

1996 births
Living people
Place of birth missing (living people)
Japanese male butterfly swimmers
Swimmers at the 2020 Summer Olympics
Olympic swimmers of Japan
World Aquatics Championships medalists in swimming
21st-century Japanese people